The Enhanced Tactical Computer or ETC is a portable rugged computer, built by Elbit Systems, and used by the US Military. It is a modular system, built using COTS hardware, and enclosed in MIL-STD 810 cases, build to withstand harsh conditions and temperatures from -25° to 55°C.

Specs
5.5kg
10"x9"x3.5"
Operating Sys Windows xp

Hardware
It is uses a Pentium III processor, which can be upgraded via a specially designed removable module. It is equipped with a touch screen TFT display, with 600x800 resolution.  Removable 10-40gig hard drive, and removable power supply.

Includes an embedded GPS receiver, LAN jack, USB port, PS2 port. Two PC Card Type II or a single Type III are available. Communications interfaces are supported via Elbit's communications controller, supporting up to six networks at 64 kbit/s. Compatible with Windows or Linux operating systems.

See also
Military computers

Sources

Military computers
Military electronics of the United States